Eid as a name may refer to:

Islamic holidays
An Eid is a Muslim religious festival:
 Eid Milad un Nabi, alternate name for Mawlid ("Birth of the Prophet"), the date of observance of the birthday of the Islamic prophet Muhammad
 Eid al-Fitr ("Feast of Breaking the Fast"), marks the end of the month of Ramadan
 Eid al-Adha ("Feast of the Sacrifice"),  falls on the 10th day of Dhu al-Hijjah and lasts for four days until the 13th day

In addition, Shia Muslims may observe:
 Eid al-Ghadir, an Eid for Shia Muslims which marks the nomination of Ali, Mohammed's cousin, as the successor of Mohammed
 Eid al-Mubahila, an Eid for Shia Muslims which marks the success of Muslims in a peaceful debate with the Christians of the time
 Eid-e-Shuja', an Eid for Shia Muslims which marks the end of the mourning period after the events of Karbala

Places

Norway
 Eid, Norway, a former municipality in Sogn og Fjordane county
 Eid, Hordaland, a former municipality in Hordaland county
 Eid, Møre og Romsdal, a former municipality in Møre og Romsdal county

Scotland
 Eid, the Shetland dialect name for Aith, Shetland

See also
EID (disambiguation)